Bartonella washoensis is a bacterium from the genus Bartonella which was first isolated from a dog with mitral valve endocarditis. Bartonella washoensis can infect squirrels but also can cause meningitis in humans.

References

Bartonellaceae